David Goins (born July 26, 1960) is an American politician who was elected in 2021 as the first African American mayor of Alton, Illinois.

Biography
Goins was born on July 26, 1960, the son of Mark and Opal Goins. His mother died in 1967 and his father died in 1971. He was raised thereafter by his grandparents. In 1978, he graduated from Alton High School. In 1983, he graduated from the College of the Ozarks on a full basketball scholarship with a B.A. in English. After school, he worked as a detention officer and correctional officer at the Madison County Department of Court and Probation Services. In 1986, he joined the Alton Police Department reaching sergeant in 1999. He retired as a police office in 2010. in 2017, he was elected to the Alton school board.

In 2021, Goins entered the race for mayor of Alton on a platform focusing on the recruitment of new businesses, job growth, the revitalization of the downtown, COVID-19 vaccinations, and the encouragement of recent college graduates to return to the city. He was supported by the local unions. On April 6, 2021, Goins was elected mayor of Alton defeating two-term Mayor Brant Walker 2,021-1,625 to become the first African-American mayor since the city's founding in 1818. In 2019, Alton was 68.7% white, 24.9% Black, 0.4% Asian, 1.6% Latino, and 4.3% multi-racial. He was sworn in on May 12, 2021. In July 2021, Illinois Governor J.B. Pritzker appointed Goins to the Central Port District Board. Upon taking office, he faced 8.5% unemployment, the loss or closure of over 200 businesses due to Covid, and a budget shortfall fueled by underfunded public employees' pensions.

Personal life
In 1985, he married Sheila Goins; they have three children. Since 2001, he has served as a pastor at the Morning Star Missionary Baptist Church in Alton. In 2018, he was diagnosed with prostate cancer.

References

African-American mayors in Illinois
21st-century American politicians
Mayors of places in Illinois
1960 births
Living people
21st-century African-American politicians
People from Alton, Illinois
College of the Ozarks alumni